The 2013–14 Arizona Wildcats men's basketball team represented the University of Arizona during the 2013–14 NCAA Division I men's basketball season.  The team was led by fifth-year head coach Sean Miller and played home games at McKale Center in Tucson, Arizona as a member of the Pac-12 Conference. They finished the season 33–5, 15–3 in Pac-12 play and won their first Pac-12 regular season championship since 2011 (the 13th time overall). They advanced to the championship game of the Pac-12 tournament where they lost to UCLA. They received an at-large bid to the NCAA tournament where they defeated Weber State, Gonzaga, and San Diego State to advance to the Elite Eight where they lost to Wisconsin.

Previous season
Arizona's 2012–13 team finished with a record of 27–8 after advancing to the NCAA tournament's Sweet Sixteen.  The team went 12–6 in the Pac-12 regular season, putting them in a three-way tie for second place.  In the Pac-12 tournament, the team defeated Colorado to advance to the semifinals, where they lost to UCLA.  Ranked 21st in the post-season AP poll, the Cats were seeded 6th in the West Region of the NCAA tournament. Arizona won its first two tournament games, defeating 11-seed Belmont and 14-seed Harvard, before falling to 2-seed Ohio State in the regional semifinals.

Off-season

Departures

Incoming transfers

 Point guard T. J. McConnell and center Matt Korcheck first played for Arizona in 2013-14 after red-shirting the previous season.  McConnell, a Duquesne transfer and the nephew of Women's Basketball Hall of Fame member Suzie McConnell Serio, was required to sit out 2012–13 under NCAA transfer rules. Korcheck was eligible to play as a junior college transfer but arranged with Miller to redshirt given Arizona's front-court depth.  Both had two years of eligibility remaining after redshirting.

2013 recruiting class

Roster

Depth chart
 before Feb. 1

 after Feb. 1

Schedule
Arizona's thirteen-game non-conference schedule had two road games, two neutral-site games, and nine home games.  The team spent Thanksgiving in New York City for the 2013 NIT Season Tip-Off semifinal and championship rounds held at Madison Square Garden.   Arizona was one of four regional hosts for the NIT Tip-Off's first and second rounds, the others being Duke, Alabama, and Rutgers.

In the unbalanced 18-game Pac-12 schedule, the Cats will face neither the Washington schools on the road nor the Los Angeles schools at home.

|-
!colspan=12 style=| Exhibition

|-
!colspan=12 style=| Non-conference regular season

|-
!colspan=12 style=";"| 

|-
!colspan=12 style=";"| 

|-
!colspan=12 style=";"| NCAA tournament

Ranking movement

Team statistics

Source

Awards
Aaron Gordon
 Freshman student-athlete of the year
 AP Honorable Mention
 2013: USA Basketball Male Athlete of the Year
 Individual All-America teams
 2014 NCAA tournament's West Regional all-tournament team
 Third All-America Team– Sporting News
 USBWA All-District team
 NABC All District Second Team
 Pac-12 All-Freshman Team
 Pac-12 First Team
 Pac–12 Freshman of the Year
 2013 NIT Season Tip-Off All-Tournament Team
 CBS Sports and U.S. Basketball Writers Association Freshman Of The Week Honors
Nick Johnson
 Junior student-athlete of the year
 Wooden All-American team
 AP All-American second team
 2014 NCAA tournament's West Regional all-tournament team
 First team All-American – TSN, USBWA
 Consensus All-American – USBWA, NABC, Sporting News
 USBWA All-District team
 NABC All District First Team
 USBWA District IX Player of the Year
 Pac-12 First Team
 Pac-12 All-Defense Team
 Pac-12 Player of the Year
 2013 NIT Season Tip-Off MVP, All-Tournament Team
 Pac-12 Player of the Week (December 2, 2013)
Rondae Hollis-Jefferson
 Pac-12 All-Freshman Team
 Freshman student-athlete of the year
Kaleb Tarczewski
 Sophomore student-athlete of the year
T. J. McConnell
 Pac-12 Second Team
 Pac-12 All-Defensive Team
Head Coach Sean Miller
 USBWA District IX Coach of the Year
 Pac-10/12 John R. Wooden Coach of the Year

References

Arizona
Arizona Wildcats men's basketball seasons
Arizona
Arizona Wildcats
Arizona Wildcats